The Mombasa–Garissa Road, also B8 Road (Kenya) is a major highway in Kenya, the largest economy in the East African Community. The road connects the port city of Mombasa to the inland city of Garissa. This road is composed of the Mombasa–Malindi Road and the Malindi–Garissa Road.

Location
The road starts in the city of Mombasa and takes a general northerly direction through Kilifi, Malindi, Garsen and Bura, to end at Garissa, a distance of approximately  The coordinates of this road west of the town of Garsen, Tana River County are:02°16'13.0"S, 40°04'24.0"E (Latitude:-2.270284; Longitude:40.073323).

Overview

In 2006, the Kenyan Government budgeted KSh.2 billion/= (almost £16 million stg. in 2008) to resurface the  section between Mombasa and Malindi, through Kilifi.

Major road connections
In Mombasa, the Mombasa–Garissa Road connects to two other major roads:
(a) the Nairobi–Mombasa Road (A109) and
(b) the Malindi–Bagamoyo Highway (A14), north-eastern Tanzania. In Garissa, this road meets the Thika–Liboi Road, connecting Thika, in Kiambu County to Liboi in Garissa County, at the border with Somalia.

Towns  
The following towns, listed from south towards north, are located along the highway:

References

External links
Visiting Kenya: the tides of change
 

Streets in Mombasa
Roads in Kenya
Geography of Kenya
Transport in Kenya
Mombasa County
Kilifi County
Tana River County
Garissa County